Jack Guy Lafontant (born 4 April 1961) is a Haitian politician who served as Prime Minister of Haiti from 21 March 2017 until 16 September 2018.

Early life and education
Lafontant studied medicine, specializing in gastroenterology and internal medicine and became a university instructor. He became a member of the Haitian Medical Association and the American College of Gastroenterology.

Career
Lafontant is a member of the Rotary Club of Pétion-Ville, Port-au-Prince, and served as the group's president in 2016.

He was appointed as prime minister on 22 February 2017 and presented his cabinet on 13 March 2017. His government obtained a vote of confidence from the Senate on 16 March and from the Chamber of Deputies on 21 March, with 95 votes for and 6 against with 2 abstentions. He assumed his responsibilities the same day his government won the vote of confidence. His position as prime minister was his debut in politics.

Following deadly mass protests against a government plan to raise fuel prices, Lafontant announced on 14 July 2018 that he had submitted his resignation to President Moïse, who accepted it.    Moise confirmed that he had accepted Lafontant's resignation and stated that he would work to find a new Prime Minister. He actually serves as caretaker.

References

1961 births
21st-century Haitian politicians
Haitian gastroenterologists
Living people
People from Port-au-Prince
Prime Ministers of Haiti